Thomas Cheek (died 1659) was an English politician.

Thomas Cheek may also refer to:

Thomas Cheek (Australian politician) (1894–1994)
Tom Cheek (1939–2005), American sportscaster

See also
Thomas Creek (disambiguation)